John Frederick Payne (3 January 1906 – 1981) was an English professional footballer who played as an outside left in the Football League for Brentford, Brighton & Hove Albion, Millwall, West Ham United and Manchester City.

Playing career

Early years 
An outside left, Payne began his career in non-league football, playing for Botwell Mission, Lyons Athletic and hometown club Southall. Payne got his big break when he signed for First Division club West Ham United in 1926, but he managed just four appearances, scoring one goal, before departing in 1929.

Brentford 
Payne dropped down to the Third Division South to sign for Brentford in 1929. He scored 16 goals in 43 appearances during the 1929–30 season and was the club's third-leading scorer behind Jack Lane and Billy Lane. Payne began the 1930–31 season as a first choice on the wing, but he fell out of favour and was dropped to the reserves, before leaving in January 1931. Payne made 53 appearances and scored 18 goals during 18 months with the Bees.

Manchester City 
Payne joined First Division club Manchester City in January 1931. As at West Ham United, Payne struggled to break into the first team and made just four appearances, scoring one goal, before departing Maine Road in 1934.

Later career 
Payne's made his final Football League appearances with Third Division South clubs Brighton & Hove Albion and Millwall.

Career statistics

References

1906 births
English footballers
English Football League players
Association football wingers
Brentford F.C. players
Footballers from Southall
Hayes F.C. players
Southall F.C. players
West Ham United F.C. players
Manchester City F.C. players
Brighton & Hove Albion F.C. players
Millwall F.C. players
Yeovil Town F.C. players
Southern Football League players
1981 deaths